Claude Haut (born 22 December 1944) was a member of the Senate of France, representing the Vaucluse department from 1995 to 2020.  He was a member of the Socialist Party until moving to LREM in 2017.

Biography

Previous mandates 

 Mayor of Vaison-la-Romaine from 1992 to 2001.
 President of the General council of Vaucluse from 2001 to 2015.
 General councillor from the Canton of Vaison-la-Romaine from 1994 to 2015.
 Departmental councillor from the Canton of Vaison-la-Romaine in 2015 (resigned). 
 Senator of Vaucluse from 1995 to 2020.

References

1944 births
Living people
Socialist Party (France) politicians
French Senators of the Fifth Republic
La République En Marche! politicians
Senators of Vaucluse